H. grandis may refer to:
 Hadrobunus grandis, a harvestman species found in the United States
 Haptodus grandis, a small sphenacodont species that lived from Latest Carboniferous to Early Permian in the equatorial Pangea
 Hazelia grandis, a spicular demosponge species that lived during the Cambrian 
 Heosemys grandis, the giant Asian pond turtle, a turtle species found in Cambodia and Vietnam and in parts of Laos, Malaysia, Myanmar and Thailand
 Hierodula grandis, the giant Asian mantis, a praying mantis species found in Bangladesh, Northeast India, and Myanmar
 Hogna grandis, a wolf spider species in the genus Hogna
 Horsfieldia grandis, a plant species found in Indonesia, Malaysia and Singapore
 Hylomyscus grandis, the Mount Oku hylomyscus, a rodent species found only in Cameroon
 Hypolepis grandis, a fern species in the genus Hypolepis

Synonyms
 Hoodia grandis, a synonym for Hoodia pilifera, a succulent plant species in the genus Hoodia

See also
 Grandis (disambiguation)